"Wonderful" is the second single by New Zealand pop and R&B singer Erakah. It was released by Illegal Musik on 21 September 2009.

Erakah won  the Best Pacific Female Artist award at the 2010 Pacific Music Awards for "Wonderful".

Music video
The music video for "Wonderful" was directed by Ivan Slavov. It shows Erakah reminiscing about her failed romance, before she and her boyfriend got back together.

References

2009 singles
Erakah songs
2009 songs
Warner Records singles
Songs written by Inoke Finau